Mayiladuthurai is a Lok Sabha (Parliament of India) constituency in Tamil Nadu. Its Tamil Nadu Parliamentary Constituency number is 28 of 39. It spreads on two districts, Mayiladuthurai and Thanjavur.

History
Mayiladuthurai (Lok Sabha constituency) has six assembly constituencies – Mayiladuthurai, Sirkali (SC), Poompuhar, Thiruvidaimarudur (SC), Kumbakonam and Papanasam.

The constituency was constituted during the third Lok Sabha (lower house) as Mayuram until the 1980 elections, when it was renamed Mayiladuthurai. During the first elections in 1957, Mayiladuthurai was part of Chidambaram constituency and was held by the Indian National Congress party.  From 1962, the Mayiladuthurai parliament seat was held by the Dravida Munnetra Kazhagam (DMK) twice between 1967 and 1971, and from 1971 to 1977, Tamil Maanila Congress for two terms between 1998 and 1999,
 and 1996 to 1998, Anna Dravida Munnetra Kazhagam twice during 2009 and 2014, Indian National Congress for eight terms during 1962–67, 1977–80, 1980–84, 1984–89, 1989–91, 1991–96, 1999–2004, and 2004–09.

Popular Communist leader K. Ananda Nambiar represented Mayiladuthurai in the Lok Sabha from 1951 to 1957. Mani Shankar Aiyar who served as a minister in India's cabinet was elected to the Parliament from the Mayiladuthurai Lok Sabha constituency in the 1991, 1999 and 2004 elections. in 2014, the Member of Parliament from the constituency was R.K. Bharathi Mohan of the AIADMK party.

The current Member of Parliament from the constituency is S. Ramalingam of the Dravida Munnetra Kazhagam party.

Assembly segments
Mayiladuturai Lok Sabha constituency is composed of the following assembly segments:

Before 2009:

1.Seerkazhi  (SC)

2.Poompukar

3.kuthalam

4.Kumbakonam

5.Thiruvidaimarudur

6. Mayiladuthurai

Members of the Parliament

Election results

General Election 2019

General Election 2014

General Election 2009

See also
 Mayiladuthurai
 Kumbakonam
 List of Constituencies of the Lok Sabha

References

 http://164.100.24.209/newls/lokaralpha.aspx?lsno=13

External links
Mayiladuturai lok sabha  constituency election 2019 date and schedule

Lok Sabha constituencies in Tamil Nadu